The Uttarakhand state is emerging as an education hub. The city of Dehradun has the highest number of centers of higher education. The list of institutions of higher education in Uttarakhand includes universities and autonomous institutes.

Institutes of National Importance

‡University of Roorkee was granted status of IIT in 2001.

Central universities

‡The university was renamed to Hemwati Nandan Bahuguna Garhwal University in 1989. It became a central university with effect from 2009 onwards.

State universities

Deemed universities

‡ Granted status of deemed university.
^ Gurukul Kangri Vishwavidyalaya is divided into three campuses: Main Campus, Haridwar; Kanya Gurukul Campus, Dehradun; and Kanya Gurukul Campus, Haridwar.

Private universities

Other notable colleges/institutes
 Law College, Dehradun
 G.B. Pant Engineering College, Ghurdauri, Pauri Garhwal now known as Govind Ballabh Pant Institute of Engineering & Technology, Pauri Garhwal
 Kumaon Engineering College, Dwarahat
 Seemant Institute of Technology, Pithoragarh
 Himalayan Institute of Technology, Dehradun
 The University of Petroleum and Energy Studies, Dehradun,
 T.H.D.C.-I.H.E.T.  COLLEGE, TEHRI 
Shivalik College of Engineering, Dehradun

References

Uttarakhand
Education
Education in Uttarakhand